Gloria is an unincorporated community in Lafayette Parish, Louisiana, United States.

The community is located between US 90  and LA Hwy 182  along LA Hwy 98.

References

Unincorporated communities in Louisiana
Unincorporated communities in Lafayette Parish, Louisiana
Acadiana